The Sheshan Observatory is an observatory on Sheshan Hill in Shanghai.

History 

It was built by French Jesuits around 1899 and is one of the oldest astronomical observatory in China (it also hosts one of China's oldest astronomical telescopes).

In 1962, Sheshan Observatory was merged with Xujiahui Observatory and was renamed the Sheshan Station of the Shanghai Astronomical Observatory.

See also 
 List of astronomical observatories

Notes and references 

Astronomical observatories in China
Landmarks in Shanghai
Tourist attractions in Shanghai